Christopher Bond (born 1945) is a British playwright and theatre director.

Christopher or Chris Bond may also refer to:
Kit Bond (born 1939), United States Senator from Missouri
Chris Bond (footballer) (born 1969), Australian rules footballer
Chris Bond (wheelchair rugby) (born 1986), Australian wheelchair rugby player
Christopher Bond (composer) (born 1992), British composer

See also